Valiente is a surname. Notable people with the surname include:

Alonso Valiente, Spanish conquistador
José María Valiente Soriano (1900-1982), Spanish Carlist politician
Carlos Enrique Díaz Sáenz Valiente (1917–1956), Argentine sport shooter
Doreen Valiente (1922–1999), English Wiccan and occult writer
Juan Valiente (died 1533), Spanish conquistador
José Francisco Valiente (1911–1988), Salvadoran politician
Marc Valiente (born 1987), Spanish footballer
Mariano Vivanco Valiente (born 1933), Cuban Roman Catholic bishop
Randy Valiente, Filipino comic book artist

Spanish-language surnames